Orange County School of the Arts (OCSA), is a 7th–12th grade public charter school located in downtown Santa Ana, California.  The school caters to middle and high school students with talents in the performing, visual, literary arts, culinary arts and more. The educational program prepares students for higher education institutions or employment in the professional arts industry.  In 2010 the school's academic and arts programs were ranked with silver medal status in the U.S. News & World Report "Best High Schools" list. In 2012 the school changed its name from Orange County High School of the Arts (OCHSA) to its current name, Orange County School of the Arts.

History
Originally, this arts program began in 1983 as Los Al Players, a summer musical theatre camp for ages 4 – 16 founded by Terry Bigelow, Jean Parks, and Ralph Opacic in Los Alamitos, CA.  Los Al Players grew into the Orange County High School of the Arts (OCHSA) in 1987 and reorganized as a public charter school on April 20, 2000. In the summer of 2000, Francis Ford Coppola served as a guest artist at the school, directing and writing a production of his musical, Gidget, with songs by John Farrar and starring Krysta Rodriguez (a student at the time) and Dermot Mulroney. During that time the school was relocated from its primary facility at Los Alamitos High School to the Santa Ana Unified School District. 

OCSA is a tuition-free, donation-dependent public charter school governed by a board of trustees representing parents, the community, educators and the Orange County Board of Education. The school is supported by The Orange County School of the Arts Foundation which is a non-profit organization for the financial support of the school's tuition-free artistic programs as well as its ongoing expansion plans. The Foundation is a registered 501(c)(3) non-profit corporation governed by a volunteer board of directors.

In the summer of 2012, the name of the school was changed from OCHSA (Orange County High School of the Arts) to OCSA (Orange County School of the Arts). This was done to account for the grades 7-8 that are also in attendance at the school.

Academics

The Orange County School of the Arts students attend standard academic courses under a block schedule system with three academic classes per day alternating each day for a total of six classes. Honors classes are offered as well as many Advanced Placement classes. OCSA also has a selection of electives including Acting, Ceramics, Improv, Graphic Design, Zoology, Vocal Ensemble, Beginner Piano, Journalism, and Photography.

OCSA's 2012 Academic Performance Index (API) score of 908 ranked the school as one of the top five ranked high schools in Orange County and in the top 10 percent in California.

OCSA was named a Blue Ribbon School in 2006 by the U.S. Department of Education. OCSA was one of 250 Blue Ribbon schools recognized nationwide in 2006 among 35 schools in the State of California and five public schools in Orange County. OCSA was also named a California Distinguished School.

In 2021, 95% of OCSA alumni continued on to college, with 76% going on to a 4-year university, 13% going to a 2-year university with plans to transfer to a 4-year university and 11% going directly into the workforce. Students must maintain a minimum 2.0 GPA to continue participating in their artistic studies.

Arts

After 2:15 p.m., Monday through Thursday, the school focuses on arts education which is divided into 16 conservatories: Production and Design, International Dance (was Ballet Folklórico),  Classical and Contemporary Dance, Commercial Dance, Creative Writing, Film and Television, Integrated Arts, Instrumental Music (divided into Strings and Orchestra, Piano, Wind Studies, and Jazz), Popular Music, Musical Theater, Acting, Classical Voice (was Opera), Visual Arts, Culinary Arts and Hospitality, Digital Media, and Arts and Enterprise (New to the 2022-23 school year).

Notable students and alumni

 Nomi Abadi – musician / activist 
 Kit Armstrong – classical pianist
 Scott Aukerman – writer / comedian
 Bae Sung-yeon – singer and member of Pristin
 Dante Basco – actor
 Dion Basco – actor  
 Drake Bell – actor / musician
 Ashley Benson – actress
 Stephanie J. Block – Broadway / Tony Winner 2018-2019
 Kara Crane –  actress
 Chad Doreck – actor
 Susan Egan – actress (also former OCSA artistic director)
 Michael Fishman – actor
 Lauren German – actress
 Vanessa Hudgens – actress / singer (attended OCSA 7th grade only)
 Dinah Jane − singer & member of Fifth Harmony
 Allison Mack – former actress, currently imprisoned for crimes related to the sex trafficking cult NXIVM
 Taryn Manning – actress
 Joe and Luke McGarry - twin musicians / graphic artists
Grace McLean -- Actress/Singer
 Lindsay Mendez – Actress / Tony Award Winner 2017-2018
 Emma Milani - Actress 
 Matthew Morrison – actor / singer / dancer
 Pedro Pascal – actor
 Monique Powell – vocalist
 Malia Pyles – actress
 Michael Repper - conductor
 Krysta Rodriguez – actress 
 Matthew Shaffer – actor / dancer
 Columbus Short – actor / choreographer
 Justice Smith — actor
 Nikki SooHoo – actress
 China Soul – singer / songwriter
 Nicholas Urie – composer
 Anneliese van der Pol – actress
 Daniel Zolghadri - actor

Notes

References

External links

 Orange County High School of the Arts
 California Department of Education
 Charter Schools Development Center's Profiles Project
 GreatSchools.net
 A miracle? Orange County High School of the Arts turns 25 from the Orange County Register

Art schools in California
Educational institutions established in 1987
Drama schools in the United States
High schools in Santa Ana, California
Charter schools in California
Public high schools in California
1987 establishments in California